Tram was a British musical duo composed of Paul Anderson and Nick Avery. Part of the slowcore movement, Tram was recognized for lush instrumentation played at a very slow pace. Tram recorded three albums, all of which were well received by the music press.
Their first album, Heavy Black Frame, was produced by multi-instrumentalist Clive Painter, and features him and his partner in Broken Dog, Martine Roberts, alongside Placebo (band) keyboardist Bill Lloyd. Heavy Black Frame was released on the Piao! label in the UK, and Jetset Records in USA. The subsequent UK albums appeared on Setanta Records. In January 2009 Paul Anderson and Clive Painter formed a new band called the 99 Call, and performed their first show in Rimini, Italy in July 2009. The performance was in part a celebration of the tenth anniversary of the release of Heavy Black Frame.

Members
 Paul Anderson
 Nick Avery

Collaborators
 Ida Akesson (piano, keyboards)
 Fiona Brice (violin, piano)
 John Frennet (bass)
 Bill Lloyd (piano)
 Hannah Marshall (cello)
 Clive Painter (production, guitar, bass, harmonium, piano, clarinet, percussion)
 Ian Painter (bass)
 John Parish (production, slide guitar)
 Martine Roberts (production, bass, vocals)
 Ian Watson (trumpet)

Discography
 Nothing Left To Say (7" single) Piao! Records
 High Ground (7" single) Piao! Records
 Songs From The Sturdy Chariot (7" single) Liquafaction
 Heavy Black Frame (album) Piao!
 Frequently Asked Questions (album) Setanta Records
 A Kind Of Closure (album) Setanta Records
The Anderson Tapes (album) Magnetic Ribbon Recordings

References

English rock music groups
1998 establishments in England
Musical groups from London
2002 disestablishments in England
Musical groups established in 1998
Musical groups disestablished in 2002
Sadcore and slowcore groups